Alor Strait  (also Alloo Strait) divides the Solor Archipelago from the Alor Archipelago, in the Lesser Sunda Islands of Indonesia. It lies mainly between the larger islands of Pantar and Lembata. 
The strait connects the western part of the Banda Sea in the north to the Savu Sea in the south.

Notes 

Straits of Indonesia
Lesser Sunda Islands